The Grand Canyon mid-air collision occurred when Grand Canyon Airlines Flight 6, a de Havilland Canada DHC-6 Twin Otter, collided with a Bell 206 helicopter, Helitech Flight 2, over Grand Canyon National Park on June 18, 1986. All 25 passengers and crew on board the two aircraft were killed. It remains the deadliest accident involving a helicopter on United States soil, surpassing the crash of Los Angeles Airways Flight 841 in 1968, which killed 23 people.

Collision 
On the morning of the accident Grand Canyon Airlines Canyon 6 took off from Grand Canyon National Park Airport at 8:55am for a sightseeing flight over Grand Canyon National Park with two pilots and 18 passengers on board; the pilots were operating their second scenic flight for the day. At 9:13 am,Helitech Flight 2 took off from the company's heliport in Tusayan, Arizona for a 30-minute sightseeing flight. At approximately 9:33 at an altitude of approximately  the Bell 206 and DHC-6 collided, with the helicopter on the left of the Twin Otter and the two aircraft traveling at approximately right angles to each other. The helicopter's main rotor struck the nose landing gear and tail of the Twin Otter. The Bell 206's main rotor was torn off and disintegrated and the Twin Otter's tail separated, causing both aircraft to crash. All 20 passengers and crew on Canyon 6, and the pilot and four passengers on Tech 2, were killed in the accident.

Cause 
The National Transportation Safety Board found that the crews of the two aircraft failed to 'see and avoid' each other, but could not determine why this occurred due to the lack of recorded flight data (there being no requirement for such recording for the scenic flights that were being operated). The accident investigation also found that the limited number of scenic points of interest in the Grand Canyon concentrated flights over these points, increasing the risk of collision; and recommended that the Federal Aviation Administration (FAA) regulate the separation of flight routes of fixed-wing aircraft and helicopters. Following the accident the FAA imposed changes to the operation of scenic flights over the Grand Canyon.

See also 

 1956 Grand Canyon mid-air collision

References

External links 
 Aviation Safety Network accident synopsis
  –  (Impact area)

Aviation accidents and incidents in the United States in 1986
Airliner accidents and incidents in Arizona
Accidents and incidents involving the de Havilland Canada DHC-6 Twin Otter
Accidents and incidents involving the Bell 206
Mid-air collisions
Mid-air collisions involving airliners
Mid-air collisions involving helicopters
Grand Canyon Airlines accidents and incidents
Grand Canyon National Park
Events in Coconino County, Arizona
1986 in Arizona
June 1986 events in the United States